Mitochondrially encoded tRNA cysteine also known as MT-TC is a transfer RNA which in humans is encoded by the mitochondrial MT-TC gene.

MT-TC is a small 82 nucleotide RNA (human mitochondrial map position 5761–5826) that transfers the amino acid cysteine to a growing polypeptide chain at the ribosome site of protein synthesis during translation.

References